Barbara Oláh (born 26 July 1993), formerly known as Barbara Kovács, is a Hungarian race walker. She competed in the women's 20 kilometres walk event at the 2016 Summer Olympics. In 2018, she competed in the women's 20 kilometres walk event at the 2018 European Athletics Championships held in Berlin, Germany. She finished in 24th place.

References

External links
 

1993 births
Living people
Hungarian female racewalkers
People from Békéscsaba
Athletes (track and field) at the 2016 Summer Olympics
Athletes (track and field) at the 2020 Summer Olympics
Olympic athletes of Hungary
Sportspeople from Békés County
21st-century Hungarian women